Major General Charles J. Dunlap Jr. (born June 16, 1950) retired in February 2010  as the deputy judge advocate general, Headquarters U.S. Air Force, Washington, D.C.

As of 2018, Dunlap is executive director of Duke Law School's Centre on Law, Ethics and National Security.

Military career 
In his capacity as deputy judge advocate general, Dunlap assisted the Judge Advocate General in the professional oversight of more than 2,200 judge advocates, 350 civilian attorneys, 1,400 enlisted paralegals and 550 civilians assigned worldwide. In addition to overseeing an array of military justice, operational, international and civil law functions, Dunlap provided legal advice to the Air Staff and commanders at all levels.

Dunlap was commissioned through the AFROTC program at St. Joseph's University in May 1972, and was admitted to the Bar of the Supreme Court of the Commonwealth of Pennsylvania in 1975. He has deployed to support various operations in the Middle East and Africa, including Provide Relief, Restore Hope, Vigilant Warrior, Desert Fox, Bright Star, and Enduring Freedom. He has led military-to-military delegations to Uruguay, the Czech Republic, South Africa and Colombia.

Dunlap speaks widely on legal and national security issues, and he is published in Air and Space Power Journal, Peacekeeping & International Relations, Parameters, Proceedings, Military Review, The Fletcher Forum of World Affairs, Air Force Times, the Wake Forest Law Review, the Air Force Law Review, the Tennessee Law Review, the Strategic Review, and the War on the Rocks foreign policy and national security platform, among others. Prior to assuming his current position, General Dunlap served as the staff judge advocate at Headquarters Air Combat Command.

Dunlap is currently a professor at Duke University School of Law, where he teaches courses on national security law and the use of force in international law, among other topics.

Dunlap wrote an essay in 1992 called The Origins of the American Military Coup of 2012, presented as a work written by an jailed anti-coup military officer 20 years into the future, in which he asserted that the blurring of the military role of the armed forces into civilian missions might be dangerous to democracy and civilian government. Douglas V. Mastriano's 2001 master's thesis, which was written as a response to Dunlap's essay and which similarly presented itself as a work by a military officer of the future, argued to the contrary; Mastriano claimed that only the military could save the United States from "morally debauched" civilian leaders.

Education

Assignments 
 January 1976 – April 1977, assistant staff judge advocate, 2nd Combat Group, Barksdale AFB, Louisiana
 April 1977 – May 1978, assistant staff judge advocate, 51st Combat Group, Osan Air Base, South Korea
 May 1978 – December 1978, chief, Civil Law Division, 20th Combat Group, Royal Air Force Upper Heyford, England
 December 1978 – March 1980, chief, Military Justice Division, 20th Tactical Fighter Wing, Royal Air Force Upper Heyford, England
 March 1980 – July 1983, faculty member, Air Force Judge Advocate General School, Maxwell Air Force Base, Alabama
 July 1983 – January 1984, chief, Military Justice Division, Air Force Judge Advocate General School, Maxwell Air Force Base, Alabama
 January 1984 – July 1984, student, Armed Forces Staff College, Norfolk, Virginia
 July 1984 – July 1987, staff judge advocate, 97th Bombardment Wing, Blytheville AFB, Arkansas
 July 1987 – June 1989, circuit military judge, Air Force Legal Services Agency, Bolling AFB, Washington, D.C.
 June 1989 – August 1991, chief, Personnel Action Law Branch, General Law Division, Headquarters U.S. Air Force, Washington, D.C.
 August 1991 – July 1992, student, National War College, Fort Lesley J. McNair, Washington, D.C.
 July 1992 – January 1995, deputy staff judge advocate, United States Central Command, MacDill Air Force Base, Florida
 January 1995 – July 1998, staff judge advocate, United States Strategic Command, Offutt Air Force Base, Nebraska
 July 1998 – July 2000, staff judge advocate, 9th Air Force, Shaw Air Force Base, South Carolina
 July 2000 – February 2002, staff judge advocate, Headquarters Air Education and Training Command, Randolph Air Force Base, Texas
 February 2002 – May 2006, staff judge advocate, Headquarters Air Combat Command, Langley Air Force Base, Virginia
 May 2006– February 2010, deputy judge advocate general, Headquarters U.S. Air Force, Washington, D.C.

Awards and decorations

Other achievements

Effective dates of promotion

See also

Egalitarianism

References 

Sources

United States Air Force generals
Recipients of the Legion of Merit
Saint Joseph's University alumni
Villanova University alumni
Living people
Judge Advocates General of the United States Air Force
1950 births
Recipients of the Defense Superior Service Medal
Foreign Policy Research Institute
Salesianum School alumni